See Amenemhat, for other individuals with this name.

{{Infobox pharaoh
| Name=Amenemhat IV 
| alt_name=Ammenemes
| Image= AmmenemesIV(Front)-BritishMuseum-August19-08.jpg 
| Caption= Small gneiss sphinxinscribed with the name of Amenemhat IVthat was reworked in Ptolemaic timesnow is on display at the British Museum. 
|ImageSize=150
| NomenHiero= 
| Nomen=AmenemhatJmn-m-ḥ3.tAmun is in front G39-N5-<-i-mn:n-m-HAt:t->
| PrenomenHiero= 
|Prenomen=MaakherureM3ˁ-ḫrw-RˁThe voice of Ra is trueM23:t-L2:t-<-ra-U5:a-xrw-w->Turin canon:MaakherureM3ˁ-ḫrw-RˁThe voice of Ra is trueV10A-N5-U4:a-P8-Z7-A17-V11A-G7  
| HorusHiero=xpr-xpr-Z3-w 
| Horus=Kheperkheperu  Ḫpr-ḫprwEverlasting of manifestations
| NebtyHiero=Ba15-s-Ba15a-H-b-W4-N16:N16 
| Nebty=Sehebtawy [S]-ḥ3b-t3wjHe who makes the two lands festive
| GoldenHiero=
| Golden=Sekhembiknebunetjeru Sḫm-bik-nbw-nṯrw The golden Horus, powerful one of the godssxm-G8-nTrw
| Reign=9 years 3 months and 27 days (Turin canon) but possibly longer, 1822–1812 BC, 1815–1806 BC, 1808–1799 BC, 1807–1798 BC, 1786–1777 BC, 1772–1764 BC
| Predecessor= Amenemhat III
| coregency  = most likely 2 years with Amenemhat III
| Successor= Sobekneferu
| Father=uncertain, possibly Amenemhat III (perhaps as adoptive father)
| Mother=Hetepi
| Dynasty= 12th Dynasty 
| Died= 
| children = uncertain, possibly Sekhemre Khutawy Sobekhotep and Sonbef
| burial = uncertain Southern Mazghuna pyramid ?
}}

Amenemhat IV (also known as Amenemhet IV) was the seventh and penultimate king of the Twelfth Dynasty of Egypt (c. 1990–1800 BC) during the late Middle Kingdom period (c. 2050–1710 BC), ruling for more than nine years in the late nineteenth century BC or the early eighteenth century BC.K.S.B. Ryholt: The Political Situation in Egypt during the Second Intermediate Period, c. 1800–1550 BC, Carsten Niebuhr Institute Publications, vol. 20. Copenhagen: Museum Tusculanum Press, 1997, excerpts available online here.

Amenemhat IV may have been the son, grandson, son-in-law, or stepson of his predecessor, the powerful Amenemhat III. His reign started with a seemingly peaceful two-year coregency with Amenemhat III. He undertook expeditions in the Sinai for turquoise, in Upper Egypt for amethyst, and to the Land of Punt. He also maintained trade relations with Byblos as well as continuing the Egyptian presence in Nubia. 

Amenemhat IV built some parts of the temple of Hathor at Serabit el-Khadim in the Sinai, and constructed the well-preserved temple of Renenutet in Medinet Madi. The tomb of Amenemhat IV has not been identified, although the Southern Mazghuna pyramid is a possibility. 

Amenemhat IV was succeeded by Sobekneferu, who may have been his sister or stepsister; she was a daughter of Amenemhat III. Her reign marked the end of the Twelfth Dynasty and the beginning of the Middle Kingdom's decline into the Second Intermediate Period.

Family

Amenemhat IV's mother was a woman named Hetepi. Hetepi's only known attestation is an inscription on the wall of the temple of Renenutet at Medinet Madi, where she is given the title of "King's Mother", but not the titles of "King's Wife", "King's Daughter", or "King's Sister". However, this does not mean she was not a wife of Amenemhat III, as she would have dropped all her other titles by the time her son came to the throne.

The relationship of Amenemhat IV to Amenemhat III is debated. Amenemhat IV was the son of Amenemhat III according to Manetho, but given the age gap of 84 years, some historians believe he was a grandson. However, Neferuptah, the only sister who was older than Sobekneferu, died before Amenemhat IV's birth, since Sobekneferu is mentioned as the heir presumptive during her father's reign; thus, she cannot be Amenemhat's mother. There is no record of another son of Amenemhat III; had he existed, he would have become the heir after Amenemhat IV's passing, not Sobekneferu. 

Manetho states that Amenemhat IV married his sister Sobekneferu, who is identified as a royal daughter of Amenemhat III, and who eventually became king in her own right upon the death of Amenemhat IV. However, Manetho's claim about the marriage has not been proven correct; Sobekneferu is not known to have borne the title of "King's Wife" among her other titles. Egyptologist Kim Ryholt has alternatively proposed that Amenemhat IV was a son of Hetepi's earlier husband, and was adopted by Amenemhat III, thus becoming Sobekneferu's stepbrother – which could explain the Manethonian tradition.

More plausibly, Amenemhat IV may have died without a male heir, which could explain why he was succeeded by Sobekneferu. Some Egyptologists, such as Aidan Dodson and Kim Ryholt, have proposed that the first two rulers of the Thirteenth Dynasty, Sobekhotep I and Amenemhat Sonbef, might have been his sons outside the royal line.

Reign

Amenemhat IV first came to power as a junior coregent of his predecessor Amenemhat III, whose reign marks the apex of the Middle Kingdom period. The coregency is well attested by numerous monuments and artefacts where the names of the two kings parallel each other. The length of this coregency is uncertain; it could have lasted from one to seven years, although most scholars believe it was only two years long. The Turin Canon, a king list redacted during the early Ramesside period, records Amenemhat IV on Column 6, Row 1, and credits him with a reign of 9 years, 3 months and 27 days. Amenemhat IV is also recorded on Entry 65 of the Abydos King List and Entry 38 of the Saqqara Tablet, both of which date to the New Kingdom.

In spite of the Turin canon, the duration of Amenemhat IV's reign is uncertain. It was given as eight years under the name Ammenemes in Manetho's Aegyptiaca. In any case, Amenemhat IV's rule seems to have been peaceful and uneventful. Amenemhat IV is well attested by contemporary artefacts, including a number of scarab- and cylinder-seals.

Expeditions and foreign relations

Four expeditions to the turquoise mines of Serabit el-Khadim in the Sinai are dated to his reign by in-situ inscriptions. The latest took place in his ninth year on the throne and could be the last expedition of the Middle Kingdom, since the next inscription dates to Ahmose I's reign, some 200 years later.
In his 2nd regnal year, Amenemhat IV sent another expedition to mine amethyst in the Wadi el-Hudi in southern Egypt. The leader of the expedition was the assistant treasurer Sahathor. Farther south, three nilometer records are known from Kumna in Nubia that are explicitly dated to regnal years 5, 6, and 7, showing that Egyptian presence in the region was maintained during his lifetime.

During his reign, important trade relations must have existed with the city of Byblos on the coast of modern-day Lebanon, where an obsidian and gold chest as well as a jar lid bearing Amenemhat IV's name have been found. A gold plaque showing Amenemhat IV offering to a deity may also originate there.

In 2010, a report on continuing excavations at Wadi Gawasis on the Red Sea coast notes the finding of two wooden chests and an ostracon inscribed with a hieratic text mentioning an expedition to the fabled Land of Punt in regnal year 8 of Amenemhat IV, under the direction of the royal scribe Djedy. Two fragments of a stela depicting Amenemhat IV and dating to his regnal year 7 were found at Berenice on the Red Sea.

Building activities
Amenemhat IV completed the temple of Renenutet and Sobek at Medinet Madi that had been started by Amenemhat III,Edda Bresciani, Antonio Giammarusti: Sobek's double temple on the hill of Medinet Madî, Les Dossiers d'archéologie (Dijon) A. 2001, n° 265, pp. 132–140, see also  which is "the only intact temple still existing from the Middle Kingdom" according to Zahi Hawass, former Secretary-General of Egypt's Supreme Council of Antiquities (SCA). The foundations of the temple, administrative buildings, granaries, and residences were uncovered by an Egyptian archaeological expedition in early 2006. It is possible that Amenemhat IV built a temple in the northeastern Fayum at Qasr el-Sagha.

Amenemhat IV is responsible for the completion of a shrine at the temple of Hathor in the Sinai and may also have undertaken works in Karnak where a pedestal for a sacred barque inscribed with the names of Amenemhat III and Amenemhat IV was found in 1924.Maurice Pillet: Rapport sur les travaux de Karnak (1923–1924), ASAE 24, 1924, p. 53–88, available onlinePhotos of the pedestal

Legacy
Less than ten years after Amenemhat IV's death, the Twelfth Dynasty came to an end and was replaced by the much weaker Thirteenth Dynasty. Although the first two rulers of this new dynasty may have been sons of Amenemhat IV, political instability quickly became prevalent and kings rarely ruled beyond a couple of years. The influx of Asiatic immigrants in the Nile Delta that had started during the reigns of Amenemhat IV's predecessor accelerated under his own reign, becoming completely unchecked. Under the Thirteenth Dynasty, the Asiatic population of the Delta founded an independent kingdom ruled by kings of Canaanite descent, forming the Fourteenth Dynasty that reigned from Avaris. Approximately 80 years after the reign of Amenemhat IV, "the administration [of the Egyptian state] seems to have completely collapsed", marking the start of the Second Intermediate Period.

Tomb

The tomb of Amenemhat IV has not been identified. Nonetheless, he often is associated with the ruined Southern Mazghuna pyramid. No inscriptions have been found within the pyramid to determine the identity of its owner, but its architectural similarity with the second pyramid of Amenemhat III at Hawara has led Egyptologists to date the pyramid to the late Twelfth Dynasty or early Thirteenth Dynasty. Less likely, Amenemhat IV could have been interred in Amenemhat III's first pyramid in Dahshur, since his name has been found on an inscription in the mortuary temple.

At Dahshur, next to the pyramid of Amenemhat II, the remains of another pyramid dating to the Middle Kingdom were discovered during building work. The pyramid has not yet been excavated, but a fragment inscribed with the royal name "Amenemhat" has been unearthed. It is possible that this pyramid belongs to Amenemhat IV, although there are also kings of the Thirteenth Dynasty that bore the name Amenemhat and who could have built the pyramid. Alternatively, the relief fragment could have originated at the nearby pyramid of Amenemhat II.

See also
 List of pharaohs

References

Further reading

Ingo Matzker: Die letzten Könige der 12. Dynastie, Europäische Hochschulschriften 1986. Reihe III, Geschichte und ihre Hilfswissenschaften. Frankfurt, Bern, New York: Lang.
Wolfram Grajetzki: The Middle Kingdom of Ancient Egypt: History, Archaeology and Society, Bloomsbury 3PL (2010), 
Ian Shaw, Paul Nicholson: The Dictionary of Ancient Egypt, Harry N. Abrams, Inc., Publishers. 1995.
Stefania Pignattari: Amenemhat IV and the end of the Twelfth Dynasty'', BAR Publishing (2018), 

19th-century BC Pharaohs
18th-century BC Pharaohs
Pharaohs of the Twelfth Dynasty of Egypt
Children of Amenemhat III